The Japanese manga series Kinnikuman was written and illustrated by Yudetamago. The series follow Kinnikuman, a superhero who must win a wrestling tournament to retain the title of prince of Planet Kinniku.

The manga was first published in Shueisha's magazine Weekly Shōnen Jump as a two one-shots in December 1978 and March 1979. The regular serialization started with the publication of the first chapter in the May 28, 1979 issue of Weekly Shōnen Jump, where it was serialized weekly until its conclusion in March 1987.

The 387 chapters were collected and published into 36 tankōbon volumes by Shueisha starting on December 20, 2002; the last volume was released on October 2, 2009. The manga was adapted into a 137-episode anime series produced by Toei Animation that aired in Japan on Nippon Television (NTV) from April 3, 1983 to October 1, 1986. Additionally, a 46-episode series was produced by Toei and aired on NTV from October 6, 1991 to September 27, 1992.

After 24 years, the series returned to be published on November 28, 2011 in Shū Play News, Shueisha's web version of Weekly Playboy. The collected editions for the revived serial resumed the numbering from the original series, starting with the 37th volume published on January 29, 2010. As of March 17, 2023, 81 volumes were released.

Volume list

References

Kinnikuman
Chapters